Oleksandr Ivanovych Danchenko (born November 14, 1974) is a Ukrainian politician. He was elected to the Verkhovna Rada in the October 2014 Ukrainian parliamentary election, appearing 10th on the party list of Self Reliance. Formerly the CEO of a telecom provider Data Group, currently he is the head of the Parliamentary Committee for Informatization and Communications. He failed 
to win reelection in the 2019 Ukrainian parliamentary election.

Biography 
Born in Kryvyi Rih, Dnipropetrovsk Oblast. Attended school No. 108 in Kyiv, which he graduated with silver medal. In 1997 graduated from National Technical University of Ukraine 'Kyiv Polytechnic University', the faculty of Construction and Technology of Radio-electronic Devices. Later he received MBA degree from International Institute of Management in Kyiv (in 2007) and attended the Institute of Administrative Management (TEMIS) in Canada.

Danchenko started his career in 1995, obtaining the post of technical director in the company 'UkrTraks'. In 1998 became the CEO of the satellite communication company CTC. Starting 2001 he was the CEO of the telecommunication company Datastat. In 2005 created the national communication operator Datagroup by pooling together companies CTC, Datastat, Datacom, Krokus Telecom. He retained the post of Datagroup CEO until his election to the Parliament of Ukraine.

In 2004, Danchenko received the State Order 'Honourable Communication Worker of Ukraine'. In 2007 was distinguished as one of the three best CEOs in communications. In 2007 and 2008, the magazine 'Economy' named him the best Top-manager in the fixed communications market.

Danchenko is a philanthropist and active supporter of sports for children and adults alike. He has been supporting the children's football team of the School #15, contributed to organisation of the Ukraine Football Cup and Ukraine Football Supercup, created the League of Mixed Martial Arts. Also, he is supporting small businesses, education and telemedicine (in collaboration with the charity 'Open Hearts').

Danchenko has a wife named Viktoriya with whom he has two daughters.

References 

1974 births
Living people
Politicians from Kryvyi Rih
Kyiv Polytechnic Institute alumni
Businesspeople from Kyiv
Eighth convocation members of the Verkhovna Rada
Self Reliance (political party) politicians
Businesspeople from Kryvyi Rih